Alain Moizan (born 18 November 1953) is a French former professional football midfielder.

In February 2008, he was appointed coach of the Mauritania national football team, his second national team coaching job after a short stint with Mali in 2004.

References

External links
 Profile on French federation official site

1953 births
Living people
Sportspeople from Saint-Louis, Senegal
French footballers
France international footballers
Association football midfielders
Angoulême Charente FC players
AS Monaco FC players
Olympique Lyonnais players
AS Saint-Étienne players
SC Bastia players
AS Cannes players
Ligue 1 players
Ligue 2 players
French football managers
SC Bastia managers
Expatriate football managers in Mali
Mali national football team managers
Expatriate football managers in Mauritania
Mauritania national football team managers
New Caledonia national football team managers
French sportspeople of Senegalese descent